Bulatovo is the name of several rural localities in Russia:
Bulatovo, Altai Krai, a selo in Kuyagansky Selsoviet of Altaysky District of Altai Krai
Bulatovo, Arkhangelsk Oblast, a settlement in Yarnemsky Selsoviet of Plesetsky District of Arkhangelsk Oblast
Bulatovo, Abzelilovsky District, Republic of Bashkortostan, a village in Almukhametovsky Selsoviet of Abzelilovsky District of the Republic of Bashkortostan
Bulatovo, Blagoveshchensky District, Republic of Bashkortostan, a village in Sanninsky Selsoviet of Blagoveshchensky District of the Republic of Bashkortostan
Bulatovo, Chelyabinsk Oblast, a village in Sokolovsky Selsoviet of Uysky District of Chelyabinsk Oblast
Bulatovo, Chuvash Republic, a village in Koltsovskoye Rural Settlement of Vurnarsky District of the Chuvash Republic
Bulatovo, Iznoskovsky District, Kaluga Oblast, a village in Iznoskovsky District, Kaluga Oblast
Bulatovo, Kozelsky District, Kaluga Oblast, a selo in Kozelsky District, Kaluga Oblast
Bulatovo, Kirov Oblast, a village in Kaysky Rural Okrug of Verkhnekamsky District of Kirov Oblast
Bulatovo, Kostroma Oblast, a village in Vorobyevitskoye Settlement of Vokhomsky District of Kostroma Oblast
Bulatovo, Krasnoyarsk Krai, a village in Chaykovsky Selsoviet of Bogotolsky District of Krasnoyarsk Krai
Bulatovo, Moscow Oblast, a village in Dubrovitskoye Rural Settlement of Podolsky District of Moscow Oblast
Bulatovo, Novosibirsk Oblast, a selo in Kuybyshevsky District of Novosibirsk Oblast
Bulatovo, Alexandrovsky District, Perm Krai, a village under the administrative jurisdiction of the city of krai significance of Alexandrovsk in Perm Krai
Bulatovo, Krasnovishersky District, Perm Krai, a settlement in Krasnovishersky District, Perm Krai
Bulatovo, Pskov Oblast, a village in Pskovsky District of Pskov Oblast
Bulatovo, Republic of Tatarstan, a village in Zelenodolsky District of the Republic of Tatarstan
Bulatovo, Kashinsky District, Tver Oblast, a village in Bulatovskoye Rural Settlement of Kashinsky District of Tver Oblast
Bulatovo, Rzhevsky District, Tver Oblast, a village in Itomlya Rural Settlement of Rzhevsky District of Tver Oblast
Bulatovo, Selizharovsky District, Tver Oblast, a village in Dmitrovskoye Rural Settlement of Selizharovsky District of Tver Oblast
Bulatovo, Zharkovsky District, Tver Oblast, a village in Novoselkovskoye Rural Settlement of Zharkovsky District of Tver Oblast
Bulatovo, Vologda Oblast, a village in Domshinsky Selsoviet of Sheksninsky District of Vologda Oblast
Bulatovo, Danilovsky District, Yaroslavl Oblast, a village in Danilovsky Rural Okrug of Danilovsky District of Yaroslavl Oblast
Bulatovo, Rostovsky District, Yaroslavl Oblast, a village in Perovsky Rural Okrug of Rostovsky District of Yaroslavl Oblast